Ethel Frances Butwell Bellamy (17 November 1881 – 7 December 1960) was an English astronomical computer and seismologist. She helped catalogue the position of over a million stars.

Biography 
Bellamy was born in Oxford on 17 November 1881 to Montague Edward James Butwell Bellamy (1850–1908) and Mary Bellamy (née Castell). Her uncle Frank Arthur Bellamy was the senior of the two assistants at the Radcliffe Observatory of the University of Oxford; in 1899, at 17 years old, Ethel started to work for him, on a part-time basis from home, as an assistant. She performed computations for Oxford's contributions to the Carte du Ciel and Astrographic Catalogue projects, under the directions of the Savilian Professor of Astronomy, Herbert Hall Turner. In 1912 Turner appointed her as second assistant at the observatory, a permanent full-time post, for £50 a year. The job that she took had previously been occupied by another of her uncles, Frederick Bellamy, who had died at an early age before she was born.

After the completion of Oxford's role in the Astrographic Catalogue, Turner decided to assist the Vatican Observatory, which was having difficulty with its computations. From 1911 to 1928, Bellamy performed the reductions on the measurements and prepared the results for publication; the analysis of the Vatican's zone was "wholly in [her] hands". In recognition of her work the Vatican awarded her a silver medal in 1928; however, her work on the matter was unpaid. By 1928 she and her uncle had catalogued the position of over a million stars.

In 1918 Bellamy became the observatory's seismology assistant. She operated seismographs, managing correspondence with up to six hundred seismograph stations, and collated the data to be analysed. After Turner, or, from 1923, a new assistant called Joseph Hughes, had computed the epicentres of earthquakes, she prepared the results for publication in the International Seismological Summary (ISS). Moreover, she computed the epicentres herself for six issues during the Second World War while Hughes was serving in the armed forces. In this post she worked in an unheated hut until 1927, which caused her discomfort in addition to her generally poor health. In 1930, the year of Turner's death, she became the editor of the ISS; in his memory, she voluntarily produced an index of epicentres for 1925–1935 and a map of the world showing their locations. Between 1913 and 1939 she published nine papers, including two with her uncle. Her uncle died in 1936 and despite their long partnership her uncle left a valuable collection to Cambridge University and surprisingly he left no money. Ethel's finances were helped when Cambridge University refused her uncle's bequest so that it could be sold.

In 1939, Ethel published a paper in Nature in 1939 that focuses on the geographical distribution of epicenters of earthquakes recorded by the Seismological Committee of the British Association from 1913–1932.

Edith lived with her uncle Frank Bellamy, and 2 Winchester Road, Oxford, the house where she lived with him from 1930 to 1949, has a blue plaque in their memory.

Bellamy was a member of the British Association and was elected as a fellow of the Royal Astronomical Society on 12 March 1926. Moreover, Oxford awarded her an honorary Master of Arts degree. In July 1947 she retired and moved to Upwey, Dorset. She died in Weymouth on 7 December 1960.

References 

1881 births
1960 deaths
British seismologists
20th-century British astronomers
Women astronomers
Fellows of the Royal Astronomical Society
People associated with the University of Oxford